Park Sun-mi (born November 22, 1972) is a South Korean taekwondo athlete and coach.

Park Sun-mi won a gold medal at the 1994 Asian Taekwondo Championships in Manila and silver medal at the 1995 World Taekwondo Championships in Manila.

Since the beginning of 2015 she is a head coach of Azerbaijani national female taekwondo team.

References

1972 births
Living people
South Korean female taekwondo practitioners
Recipients of the Tereggi Medal
World Taekwondo Championships medalists
Asian Taekwondo Championships medalists
20th-century South Korean women